Jacob George Miller (born Jacob George Muenzing; December 1, 1895 – August 24, 1974) was a professional baseball outfielder who played in three games for the 1922 Pittsburgh Pirates of Major League Baseball (MLB).

Miller began his professional baseball career with the Mobile Bears of the Southern Association in 1913.  After his major league appearances, he continued to play minor league baseball, his last team being the Hagerstown Hubs in 1930.  His career minor league batting average was .303.

He was born in Baltimore, Maryland, and died in Towson, Maryland, at the age of 78.

External links

1895 births
1974 deaths
Pittsburgh Pirates players
Major League Baseball outfielders
Minor league baseball managers
Baseball players from Baltimore
Mobile Bears players
Wichita Falls Spudders players
Toronto Maple Leafs (International League) players
Birmingham Barons players
Portland Beavers players
York White Roses players
Hagerstown Hubs players